The Western Women's Collegiate Hockey League (WWCHL) is an American Collegiate Hockey Association Women's Division 1 club level hockey-only college athletic conference for women's hockey teams. It is one of four ACHA Women's Division 1 conferences, along with the Central Collegiate Women's Hockey Association, Women's Midwest College Hockey, and the Eastern Collegiate Women's Hockey League. The league has a large footprint spreading across the western United States, featuring members in Arizona, Colorado and Utah.

Among the ten members the conference has hosted, both Minnesota (2013) and Wisconsin (2002 and 2004) won ACHA national championships prior to joining the WWCHL, while Colorado and Colorado State also have lengthy histories pre-dating the conference's creation. The rest of the league roster, however, consists of newer programs, largely in emerging hockey locales. Denver began play, as the WWCHL itself did, for the 2014–15 season. Arizona State started its program in 2016–17 while Grand Canyon and the University of Utah did so in 2017–18 and 2019–20, respectively.

Current membership

Membership timeline

Playoff championship game results

Regular season champions

2014–15 Colorado State
2015–16 Lindenwood–Belleville
2016–17 Lindenwood–Belleville
2017–18 Colorado
2018–19 Colorado
2019–20 Colorado

ACHA National Tournament appearances

Appearances made while a WWCHL member.

World University Games selections

Since 2011, the American Collegiate Hockey Association has supplied players for the United States team at the World University Games women's hockey tournament, held biennially and as part of the multi-sport event for college and university student-athletes.

Notable ACHA award winners

See also
American Collegiate Hockey Association
Arizona State University Sun Devils Division 1 Women's Ice Hockey
Lindenwood–Belleville Lynx women's ice hockey
List of ice hockey leagues

External links
Western Women's Collegiate Hockey League
Western Women's Collegiate Hockey League Facebook page
Arizona State University Women's Hockey
Colorado State University Women's Hockey
Grand Canyon University Women's Hockey
University of Colorado Boulder Women's Hockey
University of Denver Women's Hockey
University of Utah Hockey

References

ACHA Division 1 conferences
3